Cyaniriodes siraspiorum is a species of butterfly of the family Lycaenidae. It is found on Luzon and Samar in the Philippines.

References

Butterflies described in 1979
Poritiinae